Grumari is a neighborhood in the West Zone of Rio de Janeiro, Brazil. Grumari is a municipal park and is the city's only neighborhood with no residents. Grumari has beaches that have not changed in hundreds of years. Salt marsh vegetation grows next to the beach and a rain forest surrounds its hills.

A nude beach is next to Grumari beach called Abricó beach (Portuguese for Apricot beach). It is the only nude beach around the city. Five virgin beaches with pristine vegetation are in this neighborhood: Inferno Beach (Hell's beach), Funda beach (Deep Beach), Búzios beach (Whelks beach), Meio's beach (middle's beach) and Perigoso beach (dangerous beach).

The word Grumari comes from ancient South American dialects. the word refers to the tip of a mammal's nipples. In the same way, the beach sticks out onto the ocean, "feeding" the fish.

Gallery

References

External links 

Neighbourhoods in Rio de Janeiro (city)